Gustavo Martín Lanaro (born March 21, 1986) is an Argentine-Chilean footballer who currently plays for Chilean side Rangers as a striker.

Personal life
He's the twin brother of Germán Lanaro. They both naturalized Chilean by descent, since their grandmother is Chilean.

References

External links
 
 Gustavo Lanaro at playmakerstats.com (English version of ceroacero.es)
 

1986 births
Living people
People from Villa Regina
Argentine sportspeople of Chilean descent
Argentine footballers
Argentine expatriate footballers
Citizens of Chile through descent
Chilean footballers
Primera B Metropolitana players
Primera D Metropolitana players
Primera C Metropolitana players
Torneo Argentino B players
San Telmo footballers
Club Atlético Lugano players
General Lamadrid footballers
Primera B de Chile players
Chilean Primera División players
Unión San Felipe footballers
Coquimbo Unido footballers
Deportes Valdivia footballers
Santiago Wanderers footballers
San Luis de Quillota footballers
Rangers de Talca footballers
Argentine expatriate sportspeople in Chile
Expatriate footballers in Chile
Association football forwards
Argentine emigrants to Chile
Naturalized citizens of Chile
Twin sportspeople
Chilean twins